Ramaria decurrens, commonly known as the ochre coral, is a coral mushroom in the family Gomphaceae. It is found in Europe and North America.

Taxonomy
The species was originally described under the name Clavaria decurrens by Christian Hendrik Persoon in 1822.

References

Gomphaceae
Fungi described in 1822
Fungi of North America
Taxa named by Christiaan Hendrik Persoon